The official coinage of the Isle of Man are denominated in Manx pounds. From 1971 to 2016, coins of the Isle of Man were minted by Pobjoy Mint Limited. Since 2017, coins of the Isle of Man are minted by the Tower Mint.

Due to matching appearance and value of pound sterling coins, these coins often appear in circulation within the United Kingdom. However, they are not legal tender there. Conversely, the Isle of Man does recognise pound sterling coins.

As well as producing non-circulating commemorative designs, the Isle of Man regularly changes the designs on the circulating coins.

The Manx pound matches the pound sterling and went decimal in 1971, with the UK, however since this date the Isle of Man has been at the forefront of coin innovation: The £1 coin was introduced on the Isle of Man in 1978, 5 years before the United Kingdom's equivalent, and there is currently a circulating £5 coin.

Below are descriptions of some of the different designs in circulation from the Isle of Man. This page does not cover non-circulating commemorative designs, such as the traditional Christmas 50 pence coins each year and the various crowns.

One penny

Two pence

Five pence

Large size

Small size

Ten pence

Large size

Small size

Twenty pence

Fifty pence

Large size - standard design

Large size - commemorative issues

Small size

Small size - Commemorative issues

One pound

Two pounds

Five pounds

References

External links

Isle of Man Treasury – Coins

Coins of the Isle of Man
Manx pound